Ydiellini is a tribe of cicadas in the family Cicadidae, found in Africa. There are at least two genera and four described species in Ydiellini.

Genera
These two genera belong to the tribe Ydiellini:
 Maroboduus Distant, 1920
 Nablistes Karsch, 1891

References

Further reading

 
 
 
 
 
 
 
 

Tettigomyiinae
Hemiptera tribes